Systomus timbiri, also known as Timbiri barb, is a species of cyprinid fish endemic to Sri Lanka.

References

Systomus
Fish described in 1963